Vlezenbeek is a small town of 3,324 in the Flemish Brabant southwest of Brussels, Belgium. It is part of the municipality Sint-Pieters-Leeuw. It is the home of Neuhaus, an international exporter of fine Belgian chocolate, as well as Lindemans Brewery, a brewery that produces lambics, a distinctly Belgian type of beer.

References

Populated places in Flemish Brabant